The 2013 Knoxville Challenger was a professional tennis tournament played on hard courts. It was the tenth edition of the tournament which was part of the 2013 ATP Challenger Tour. It took place in Knoxville, United States between 4 and 10 November 2013.

Singles main-draw entrants

Seeds

 1 Rankings are as of October 28, 2013.

Other entrants
The following players received wildcards into the singles main draw:
  Jarryd Chaplin
  Jarmere Jenkins
  Jack Sock

The following players used protected ranking into the singles main draw: 
  Laurent Rochette

The following players received entry as an alternate into the singles main draw:
  Edward Corrie
  Denis Kudla
  David Rice

The following players received entry from the qualifying draw:
  Mitchell Frank
  Takanyi Garanganga
  Kevin King
  Sanam Singh

The following players received entry into the singles main draw as lucky losers:
  Fritz Wolmarans

Champions

Singles

 Tim Smyczek def.  Peter Polansky 6–4, 6–2

Doubles

 Samuel Groth /  John-Patrick Smith def.  Carsten Ball /  Peter Polansky 6–7(6–8), 6–2, [10–7]

External links
Official Website

Knoxville Challenger
Knoxville Challenger
2013 in American tennis
2013 in sports in Tennessee